Anne Dandurand (born November 19, 1953) is a French-Canadian actor, producer, activist and author. She was born in Montreal, and appeared regularly on Canadian film and TV during the 1970s. She wrote her first book La louve-garou with her twin sister Claire Dé. She lives in Montreal.

Selected works

With Claire Dé
 La louve-garou

Sole author
 La louve-garou (1982)
 Voilà, c'est moi : c'est rien, j'angoisse (Journal imaginaire) (1987)
 L'assassin de l'intérieur. Diables d'espoir (1988)
 Un coeur qui craque (Journal imaginaire) (1990)
 Petites âmes sous ultimatum (1991)
 Les secrets d'Olympia. Les touffes flottantes (1993)
 La salle d'attente (1994)
 La marquise ensanglantée (1996)
 Les porteuses d'ombre (1999)

Available in English
 The Cracks (translated by Luise von Flotow)
 Deathly Delights (translated by Luise Von Flotow)
 The Waiting Room (translated by Robert Majzels)

Awards
 1990 Grand Prix de la nouvelle pour la jeunesse

References

1953 births
Living people
Canadian novelists in French
20th-century Canadian novelists
Canadian women novelists
Writers from Montreal
French Quebecers
Actresses from Montreal
20th-century Canadian women writers